Eirian Williams (born 3 September 1955) is a former professional snooker referee. He was formerly a police officer with the Dyfed-Powys Police in the Welsh town of Llanelli for 18 years.

Early life
Williams was born in Llanelli, Wales, and joined the Dyfed-Powys Police in April 1975 and was stationed at Llanelli where he was mainly in the Road Traffic Department during which time he achieved the covetted Grade 1 Police Advanced Driving Certificate. He is also a trained Police Motorcyclist. Following spells at Llandeilo and Ammanford Police Stations (where he had spells in the CID), he retired in February 1993.

Refereeing career 
Williams attained the Class C Snooker Referees accreditation in 1981 and within five years, was the Senior Welsh Referee in the Home International Series. By 1991, his Refereeing Classification had twice been upgraded and he now held the Class 1 (formerly A) certificate. In 1991, the Professional tour, run by the World Professional Billiards and Snooker Association (WPBSA) opened the Professional game to an unlimited number of players thus requiring more Referees to officiate at the subsequent extra matches. He was invited to join the Professional Referees Association and became one of a significant number of new Referees from around the globe to give their services to the Professional game. Following his retirement from the Police Service, he undertook several jobs to subsidise his income while he climbed his way up the Professional Refereeing ladder. By 1993, he had been appointed as a Referee Examiner with the Welsh Referees Association. He is now a Tutor with the European Billiards and Snooker Association.

He refereed his first World Ranking final in January 1998 at the Regal Welsh tournament in Newport, Monmouthshire where Paul Hunter won his first Ranking event title by defeating John Higgins by 9 frames to 5. He has since refereed many more Ranking finals including the Seniors Championship, Welsh Open Championship, Australian Goldfields Open, German Masters, UK Championship, Irish Masters, Wembley Masters, Malta Cup, China Masters, China Open, Thailand Open, British Open, Grand Prix, Bahrain Snooker Championship, World Open and four World Championship Finals at the Crucible Theatre, Sheffield in 2001, 2005, 2007 and 2010.

In November 2014, his retirement from the professional circuit was announced.

Personal life 
Williams was raised in a small mining village called Cynheidre in the Gwendraeth Valley in South Wales, but now lives five miles away in Llanelli.

He has three children, Geraint, Rhian and Bethan together with seven granddaughters, Evie, Amelia, Aylah, Alis, Gracie, Elsie and Mila.

Since 2007, he has been utilising his spare time by Volunteer driving with the Welsh Ambulance Service, transporting patients to medical appointments and procedures around the UK.

References

 profile on World Snooker.com

1955 births
Living people
Welsh police officers
Dyfed-Powys Police officers
Sportspeople from Llanelli
Snooker referees and officials
Place of birth missing (living people)
Welsh referees and umpires

https://wst.tv/referee-eirian-williams-retires/